Tarchumas "Tadas" Murnikas was a Lithuanian cyclist and a member of the Lithuanian Sports Club Makabi. He competed in the individual road race event at the 1928 Summer Olympics. He represented the Lithuanian Makabi club.

References

External links
 

Year of birth missing
Possibly living people
Lithuanian male cyclists
Olympic cyclists of Lithuania
Cyclists at the 1928 Summer Olympics
Lithuanian Jews
Place of birth missing